Monday is a 2020 drama film directed by Argyris Papadimitropoulos, from a screenplay he co-wrote with Rob Hayes. It stars Sebastian Stan and Denise Gough.

The film had its world premiere on September 11, 2020, at the Toronto International Film Festival as part of TIFF Industry Selects. It was released in the United States on April 16, 2021, by IFC Films. The film received mixed reviews from critics.

Plot
At a party one hot summer night in Athens, Greece, Mickey is introduced to Chloe.  The attraction between the pair is immediately palpable—so palpable that before they know it they're waking up naked on the beach on Saturday morning.

Unfortunately, they wake up naked and surrounded by families, children - and police, who wait for them to dress before taking them into the station. But when they get there, the captain orders the cuffs removed and asks the cops exactly what they expect to charge them with. When the cops reply, “Indecent exposure,” the captain brushes it off and tells them to sign his book and go away.

Chloe has left a toxic relationship and is leaving for America in two days, but her purse is in the house where the party was. Since Mickey can’t get Argyris, his friend and business partner, on the phone, he invites her to join him on an island where he has a DJ gig.

They spend the day on the island, dancing and getting to know one another. By the end of the night a romance has developed and Mickey tries to convince Chloe to stay in Greece; she rebuffs him, and when Argyris brings her purse to her apartment, they part awkwardly.

The next night Mickey sulks as Argyris and his friends sit in his home; Argyris realizes Mickey has fallen in love with Chloe and convinces him to go to the airport. The big romantic gesture works, and the next thing we see is them moving in together.

They are truly in love… but Mickey is an irresponsible free spirit and Chloe is an immigration lawyer. Can this work?

Mickey’s old band mate visits and with Chloe passed out on the couch after dinner, they do cocaine in the bathroom and she tries to convince him to join her on the road, writing songs and performing. The implication seems to be that they will presumably spark up an old romance. Mickey seems tempted, but Chloe comes in, needing to use the toilet, and the spell is broken.

Mickey and Argyris have a freelance advertising jingle gig that isn’t going well. While Chloe meets with an immigration client in the dining room, Mickey and Argyris placate their client in the living room, to no avail.

Chloe and Mickey plan a party for all their friends. They’re   supposed to meet his ex, Aspa, the mother of his son, Hector, that afternoon; he convinces her to meet with Aspa alone, and promises he’ll take care of the party food.

At lunch, Aspa tells Chloe Mickey is a terrible father; he’s never bothered to learn Greek, and has never spent time with Hector. When Chloe returns home, he has not done any party planning. She is upset; along with the many other instances in their life together, this merely serves to confirm what Aspa told her.

Chloe takes a pregnancy test and isn’t pleased. Takeout food arrives shortly before the guests do. Chloe is unimpressed; Mickey obviously ordered it after she arrived home and he realized he’d forgotten all about his promise.

The party gets into full swing and their friends clearly do not get along. It is a disaster, but Chloe and Mickey at least can laugh about it at the end of the night. However, they end up having terrible sex.

A social worker visits and tells them that Aspa has stipulated the visitation and guardianship must be shared between Chloe and Mickey. Mickey may not be the sole guardian nor have visitation alone. This seems to trouble Chloe almost more than it does Mickey.

Chloe has an abortion and hides it from Mickey. She pretends to have the stomach flu, and puts him off when he tries to initiate sex.

They attend a wedding of a friend of Chloe’s and her ex, Christos, is there. He is controlling and toxic. Mickey is jealous and intimidated by Christos' wealth and power; he gets drunk and begins scowling and stalking around the wedding ominously. Argyris tries to convince him that he should not sabotage this relationship the way he always has in the past, that Chloe loves him.

And, of course, Mickey marches out to the bandstand, grabs the microphone, and makes a complete fool of himself, embarrassing Chloe and halfheartedly proposing to her.

At Christmastime, the Friday before Hector’s first visit, they argue about a clogged kitchen sink; Chloe complains Mickey will not take care of it and call a plumber like he should. Later, she apologizes and explains she is nervous. She proposes they learn a Greek song together to sing to Hector. They sit at his instrument and play it together, drinking cocktails and dancing together joyfully.

Chloe asks Mickey to take her out dancing, for one more carefree night before they become responsible parents. They ride his motorcycle to a club (she’s wearing the helmet he gave her on her birthday, with her name written on it). At the club they drink tequila shots, and Chloe insists Mickey find them some drugs. While he searches for some, Chloe somehow finds it, and they do cocaine in the bathroom. For a while on the dance floor they enjoy their high, but then Mickey gets into an altercation, and gets them kicked out, leaving behind their jackets and helmets.

They then drive, and Chloe’s nuzzling encourages Mickey to pull over; they run down into a closed basement restaurant where they begin having sex. Chloe begins to cry and confesses to the abortion. When Mickey is not upset, this angers Chloe, and they begin arguing, but this alerts a security guard and they must run out.

Back at the motorcycle, as Mickey prepares to leave, Chloe stops him and reminds him of their first night together, of being naked on the beach. She convinces him to get naked and go to the beach. They strip and get on the cycle, and drive quite a ways before pulling up right next to a cop car at a red light. A chase ensues, and while Mickey insists he should pull over, Chloe eggs him on, telling him to keep going.

After a brief chase involving several police cars, they are cornered and stopped. Mickey is quickly cuffed, but Chloe struggles and slaps a cop twice - once backhanded. We are back where we were at the beginning, the two of them stark naked and being arrested, in the back of police cars; but this time, Chloe is belligerent on cocaine and alcohol and has assaulted an officer. They will not be treated as lightly as they were the first time, when the police basically laughed it off.

They are taken to the station and charged, told they will go to court on Monday, meaning they will miss Hector’s visit tomorrow. Aghast, both of them plead to be allowed to leave and return, but to no avail. They are separated, and Chloe spends the weekend sleeping on cement benches in jail.

On Monday, Chloe speaks to a female attorney who gives her some presentable clothes and tells her everything will be fine. Sitting before a judge, she is found guilty and receives a suspended sentence and a fine. When she asks where Mickey is, her attorney says his case was dismissed.

Chloe returns home and finds Mickey, who has been there since Saturday. Chloe is enraged to learn he called Christos to get him out and get the charges dropped. She cries and rages, but Mickey comes back - she is not an innocent party here. Who insisted on getting naked? Who hit the cop? What was he supposed to do, lose his only chance at visitation and guardianship of his son?

Chloe cries quietly on the couch; she has no reply. When next we see them, they both stand outside a school and watch as the doors open, letting out small children who run into the arms of their waiting parents. Our last view is of Mickey and Chloe's smiling, expectant faces.

Cast
Sebastian Stan as Mickey
Denise Gough as Chloe
Dominique Tipper as Bastian
Vangelis Mourikis as Takis
Andreas Konstantinou as Christos
Syllas Tzoumerkas as Manos
Sofia Kokkali as Stephanie

Production
In August 2018, it was announced Sebastian Stan and Denise Gough had joined the cast of the film, with Argyris Papadimitropoulos directing from a screenplay he wrote alongside Rob Hayes.

Release
Monday was originally scheduled to have its world premiere at the Tribeca Film Festival on April 15, 2020. However, the festival was postponed due to the COVID-19 pandemic.

The film premiered on September 11, 2020, at the Toronto International Film Festival as part of TIFF Industry Selects.  In February 2021, IFC Films acquired U.S. distribution rights to the film and set it for a April 16, 2021, release.

Reception
On review aggregator website Rotten Tomatoes, the film holds an approval rating of 49% based on 75 reviews, with an average rating of 5.6/10. The site's critics consensus reads: "Monday has attractive leads and a beautifully filmed setting, but fatal character flaws undermine the impact of this turbulent romance." According to Metacritic, which sampled 24 critics and calculated a weighted average score of 58 out of 100, the film received "mixed or average reviews".

Screen Rant gave the film a 2 out of 5 stars rating, stating that the film "fumbles its way through after a strong start and isn't interested in exploring or developing its characters as individuals or as a couple."

References

External links
 

2020 drama films
2020 independent films
2020s American films
2020s British films
2020s English-language films
American drama films
British drama films
English-language Greek films
Greek drama films
Films postponed due to the COVID-19 pandemic
Films set in Greece
Films shot in Athens
IFC Films films